Gary Graham (born June 6, 1950) is an American actor, musician, and author. He may be best known for his starring role as Detective Matthew Sikes in the television series Alien Nation (1989–1990) and five subsequent Alien Nation television films (1994–1997).

Biography and career 
Graham was born in Long Beach, California. One of his earliest roles was in the 1980 CBS mini series Scruples based on the Judith Krantz novel starring Lindsay Wagner. He was cast as a "hitman" on the television show Moonlighting co-starring opposite Bruce Willis.

He has played more than 38 TV roles and has also been in more than 40 movies.

Band names: The Gary Graham Garage Band, The Gary Graham Band and The Sons of Kirk.

He is a contributor to Breitbart News.

Television 
As well as Alien Nation and Star Trek, Graham starred in a 2008 TV pilot styled after Sin City called Dead End City. 

December 18, 1984 episode of Remington Steele, "Let's Steele A Plot" (Season 3,episode 11), as Butch Beemis.

Alien Nation 
As well as starring as Detective Matthew Sikes in the television series Alien Nation (1989–1990), he resumed this role in the TV movies Alien Nation: Dark Horizon (1994), Alien Nation: Body and Soul (1995), Alien Nation: Millennium (1996), Alien Nation: The Enemy Within (1996), and Alien Nation: The Udara Legacy (1997). He was also in Monk (2004), where he posed a huge threat to Adrian and Alison Marie.

Star Trek 
Graham guest-starred on Star Trek: Enterprise as the recurring character Ambassador Soval, a Vulcan ambassador to Earth.  He also guest-starred on Star Trek: Voyager (1995) once, playing Ocampan community leader Tanis in the season 2 episode "Cold Fire". He plays Ragnar in the fan production Star Trek: Of Gods and Men and continued this role in Star Trek: Renegades.

In 2015, Graham reprised his role as Ambassador Soval, in the fan film Star Trek: Axanar.

Movies 
His films include Hardcore, The Hollywood Knights, All the Right Moves, The Arrogant, The Last Warrior, Robot Jox, Running Woman, Siren. Gary's most recent films are InAlienable, Action Hero and Dreams Awake. Graham made his directorial debut in the spring of 2008 with the film Interviews which he also wrote.

Web-based work 
Graham also made appearances as the "Smoking Jacket Guy" in the introduction and other scenes in the Internet gaming show The Jace Hall Show.

Graham played Dr. David Macavoy in the web series Universal Dead. In late June, 2010 it was announced that Universal Dead will be made into a feature film.

Filmography

References

External links

2008 Dead End City

1950 births
Living people
American male television actors
Male actors from Long Beach, California